Jafariyeh or Jafarie (also Romanized as Ja‘farīyeh; formerly, Jafarabad, also Romanized as Ja‘farābād) is a city in and capital of Jafarabad County, in Qom Province, Iran. At the 2006 census, its population was 6,635, in 1,516 families.

References 

Qom County

Cities in Qom Province